

Belgium
 Congo Free State
 Théophile Wahis, Governor-General of the Congo Free State (1892–1908)
 Émile Wangermée, acting Governor-General of the Congo Free State (1896–1900)

France
 French Indochina – Paul Doumer, Governor-General of French Indochina (1897–1902)
 French Somaliland –
 Alfred Albert Martineau, Governor of French Somaliland (1899–1900)
 Gabriel Louis Angoulvant, acting Governor of French Somaliland (1900)
 Adrien Jules Jean Bonhoure, Governor of French Somaliland (1900–1901)
 Guinea –
 Paul Jean François Cousturier, Lieutenant-Governor of Guinea (1898–1900)
 Noël-Eugène Ballay, Lieutenant-Governor of Guinea (1900)
 Paul Jean François Cousturier, Lieutenant-Governor of Guinea (1900–1904)

Japan
 Taiwan – Kodama Gentarō, Governor-General of Taiwan (26 February 1898-April 1906)

Portugal
 Angola –
 António Duarte Ramada Curto, Governor-General of Angola (1897–1900)
 Francisco Xavier Cabral de Oliveira Moncada, Governor-General of Angola (1900–1903)

United Kingdom
 Jamaica – Augustus William Lawson Hemming, Governor of Jamaica (1898–1904)
 Malta Colony – Francis Wallace Grenfell, Governor of Malta (1899–1903)
 Colony of Natal – Sir Walter Hely-Hutchinson (1893–1901)
 New South Wales – William Lygon, Lord Beauchamp, Governor of New South Wales (1899 – 31 December 1900 then State Governor from 1 January 1901 on Australia's Federation to 1901)
 North-Eastern Rhodesia – Robert Edward Codrington, Administrator of North-Eastern Rhodesia (1898–1907)
 Barotziland-North-Western Rhodesia – Robert Thorne Coryndon, Administrator of Barotziland-North-Western Rhodesia (1900–1907)
 Queensland – Charles Cochrane-Baillie, Governor of Queensland (1896 – 31 December 1900 then State Governor from 1 January 1901 on Australia's Federation to 1901)
 Tasmania – Jenico Preston, Lord Gormanston, Governor of Tasmania (1893–1900)
 South Australia – Lord Hallam Tennyson, Governor of South Australia (1899 – 31 December 1900 then State Governor from 1 January 1901 on Australia's Federation to 1902)
 Victoria – Thomas, Earl Brassey, Governor of Victoria (1895–1900)
 Western Australia – Lieutenant-Colonel Gerard Smith, Governor of Western Australia (1895–1900)

Colonial governors
Colonial governors
1900